Mucahit Bilici is an American Muslim sociologist and the author of Finding Mecca in America: How Islam Is Becoming an American Religion (University of Chicago Press, 2012). He is associate professor of sociology at John Jay College, City University of New York and CUNY Graduate Center.

Publications

Book:
 Finding Mecca in America: How Islam Is Becoming an American Religion (University of Chicago Press, 2012)
Articles:
 "Homeland Insecurity: How Immigrant Muslims Naturalize America in Islam," Comparative Studies in Society and History (53:3), 2011.
 "Being Targeted, Being Recognized: The Impact of 9/11 on Arab and Muslim Americans," Contemporary Sociology (40:2), 2011 [review essay].
 "Muslim Ethnic Comedy: Inversions of Islamophobia," in Islamophobia/Islamophilia: Beyond the Politics of Enemy and Friend, A. Shryock, (ed.), Indiana University Press, 2010.
 "Said Nursi's Moral Philosophy," Islam and Christian-Muslim Relations (19:1), January 2008.
 "Conversion out of Islam: A Study of Conversion Narratives of Former Muslims" (with M. Khalil) The Muslim World, January 2007.
 "Ummah and Empire: Global Formations after Nation," pp. 313–327, in Blackwell Companion to Contemporary Islamic Thought, Oxford, UK: Blackwell Publishing, 2006.

References

External links
 Faculty Profile Page at John Jay College.
 Professor Mücahit Bilici: Post-PKK era will be a Kurdish spring, Today's Zaman, March 3, 2013.
 www.mucahitbilici.net His personal website.
 HAKKIN HATIRI His previous column at Taraf daily (Turkish).
 Mucahit Bilici-Yeni Yuzyil yazarlar His current column at Yeni Yuzyil.

Living people
John Jay College of Criminal Justice faculty
Graduate Center, CUNY faculty
American sociologists
People from Diyarbakır
Turkish emigrants to the United States
Year of birth missing (living people)